Invitation is the fourth studio album by British modern country-pop music duo Ward Thomas, released on 9 October 2020 by Sony Music/WTW Music. The album entered the UK Albums Chart at number 29.

Writing
The album was written during the national lockdown instituted by UK Prime Minister Boris Johnson during the COVID-19 pandemic, during 2020. The songs were recorded by the duo at their home, and sent to producer Jonathan Quarmby.

Singles
The first single, "Sweet Time", was released in Summer 2020. It was followed by "Meant to Be Me" and "Someday", released in quick succession in the weeks leading up to the album's release.

Reception
The album was reviewed in Evening Standard and The Irish News.

Track listing

Charts

Release history

References

Further reading
 WTW Music and East West partner on new Ward Thomas album. MusicWeek.
 Ward Thomas on their "much more country" new record and why National Album Day matters. MusicWeek.

External links
 Official website

2020 albums
Ward Thomas (band) albums